Terneur-Hutton House is a historic home located at West Nyack in Rockland County, New York.  It was built about 1731 and is a -story dwelling in the Dutch Colonial style. The first floor is constructed of sandstone, with painted shingles above.

It was listed on the National Register of Historic Places in 1976.

References

Houses on the National Register of Historic Places in New York (state)
Houses completed in the 18th century
Houses in Rockland County, New York
National Register of Historic Places in Rockland County, New York